Pseudonebularia doliolum is a species of sea snail, a marine gastropod mollusk in the family Mitridae, the miters or miter snails.

Description
The shell size varies between 17 mm and 30 mm.

Distribution
This species is distributed in the Indo-West Pacific, along Fiji, the Solomons Islands and New Guinea.

References

 Cernohorsky W. O. (1976). The Mitrinae of the World. Indo-Pacific Mollusca 3(17) page(s): 413

External links
 Gastropods.com : Mitra (Nebularia) doliolum; accessed : 6 December 2010

Mitridae
Gastropods described in 1839